Phaea brevicornis is a species of beetle in the family Cerambycidae. It was described by Chemsak in 1999. It is known from Colombia and Venezuela.

References

brevicornis
Beetles described in 1999